Monaco competed at the 1964 Summer Olympics in Tokyo, Japan. One competitor competed in one sport.

Weightlifting

References
Official Olympic Reports

Nations at the 1964 Summer Olympics
1964
Summer Olympics